The 2020 World Junior Curling Championships was held from February 15 to 22 at the Crystal Ice Arena in Krasnoyarsk, Russia.

Canada proved to be the best in the field in both events as Jacques Gauthier and Mackenzie Zacharias both won their respective events. Switzerland's Marco Hösli and South Korea's Kim Min-ji won the silver medals and Scotland's James Craik and Russia's Vlada Rumiantseva won the bronze medals.

Men

Qualification
A total of 10 men's teams competed at the 2020 World Junior Curling Championships. Canada, New Zealand, Norway, Scotland, Switzerland and the United States have earned their spot by finishing in the top 6 at the previous Championship. Germany, Italy and Sweden have qualified through the World Junior-B Curling Championship held in Lohja, Finland. Russia earns a spot for being the hosts.

Teams
The teams are as follows:

Notes
  Wagenseil skipped the first four games, and Hösli skipped the remaining five games.

Round-robin standings
Final round-robin standings

Draw Matrix

Round-robin results

Draw 1
Saturday, February 15, 09:00

Draw 2
Saturday, February 15, 19:30

Draw 3
Sunday, February 16, 14:00

Draw 4
Monday, February 17, 09:00

Draw 5
Monday, February 17, 19:00

Draw 6
Tuesday, February 18, 14:00

Draw 7
Wednesday, February 19, 09:00

Draw 8
Wednesday, February 19, 19:00

Draw 9
Thursday, February 20, 14:00

Playoffs

Semifinals
Friday, February 21, 14:00

Bronze-medal game
Saturday, February 22, 09:00

Final
Saturday, February 22, 09:00

Women

Qualification
A total of 10 women's teams competed at the 2020 World Junior Curling Championships. The hosts, Russia, were to be joined by the next best six placing nations in 2019: Canada, China, South Korea, Norway, Sweden and Switzerland.  However, China did not participate and were replaced by a fourth qualifier from the 'B' Championships. Denmark, Japan, Latvia and Hungary qualified through the World Junior-B Curling Championship held in Lohja, Finland.

Teams
The teams are as follows:

Round-robin standings
Final round-robin standings

Draw Matrix

Round-robin results

Draw 1
Saturday, February 15, 14:00

Draw 2
Sunday, February 16, 09:00

Draw 3
Sunday, February 16, 19:00

Draw 4
Monday, February 17, 14:00

Draw 5
Tuesday, February 18, 09:00

Draw 6
Tuesday, February 18, 19:00

Draw 7
Wednesday, February 19, 14:00

Draw 8
Thursday, February 20, 09:00

Draw 9
Thursday, February 20, 19:00

Playoffs

Semifinals
Friday, February 21, 19:00

Bronze-medal game
Saturday, February 22, 14:00

Final
Saturday, February 22, 14:00

References

External links

World Junior Curling Championships
International curling competitions hosted by Russia
World Junior Curling
Sport in Krasnoyarsk
2020 in curling
February 2020 sports events in Russia